Deuterogonaria is a genus of worms belonging to the family Haploposthiidae.

The species of this genus are found in America.

Species:

Deuterogonaria carribea 
Deuterogonaria renei 
Deuterogonaria thauma

References

Acoelomorphs